Dematin is a protein that in humans is encoded by the EPB49 gene.

References

Further reading